Sharp Dressed Men: A Tribute to ZZ Top is a tribute album released in 2002 featuring various country music artists performing classic ZZ Top songs.

Critical reception
Stephen Thomas Erlewine of Allmusic said that the album was "crackling with energy and with just enough vivid reinterpretations to make it enjoyable for fans of either the artists involved or ZZ Top."

Brian Baker of Country Standard Time writes, "A little more grit and the compilers would have had a rocking ZZ Top tribute. Of course, a little more honky tonk and hillbilly (like Alan Jackson throws down at the break in "Sure Got Cold After the Rain Fell"), and they would have had a country tribute to ZZ Top."

Track listing

Track information and credits verified from the album's liner notes.

Chart performance

References

Country albums by American artists
2002 compilation albums
ZZ Top tribute albums
RCA Records compilation albums
Country music compilation albums